Spirit of America is The Beach Boys' 1975 follow-up to the  compilation album Endless Summer released by Capitol Records the year prior.  Although it features only a handful of genuine hits, instead composed of album tracks from the band's early LPs, Spirit of America proved to be another success for The Beach Boys' former label, reaching No. 8 in the US during a chart stay of 43 weeks and going gold.

Content
After the success of its predecessor Capitol rounded up the few remaining early hits that were not released on Endless Summer, as well as some album tracks, in addition to two rare singles, "The Little Girl I Once Knew" and "Break Away". As with Endless Summer, Spirit of America was compiled and released while The Beach Boys were contracted to Reprise Records and, as such, is not considered an "official" album.

The song "Dance, Dance, Dance" featured in this album was also one of 2 Beach Boys tracks included in a promotional-only various artists compilation album issued by Capitol records entitled "The Greatest Music Ever Sold" (Capitol SPRO-8511/8512), which was distributed to record stores during the 1976 Holiday season, as part of Capitol's "Greatest Music Ever Sold" campaign which promoted 15 "Best Of" albums that were released by the record label. "Help Me, Rhonda" (the retitled original "Help Me, Ronda") from "Endless Summer" was the other Beach Boys song included.

As with the Endless Summer compilation, the 2-record set was pressed with Sides 1 & 4 on one disc and Sides 2 & 3 on the other.

The "Spirit of America" (and "Endless Summer") cover art illustrator was Keith McConnell.

Other formats
Side 1 of the cassette version features all tracks from Sides 1 & 2 except "Tell Me Why", which was placed on Side 2 as the first track, followed by Sides 3 & 4

The Capitol Records 8-track tape (8XWW-11384) running order differs from the LP and cassette, and is as follows:

PROGRAM 1: Dance, Dance, Dance : Break Away : A Young Man Is Gone : The Little Girl I Once Knew : Spirit Of America

PROGRAM 2: Little Honda : Hushabye : Hawaii : Drive-In : Good To My Baby : Tell Me Why

PROGRAM 3: 409 : Do You Remember? : This Car Of Mine : Please Let Me Wonder : Why Do Fools Fall In Love : Barbara Ann

PROGRAM 4: Custom Machine : Salt Lake City : Don't Back Down : When I Grow Up (To Be A Man) : Do You Wanna Dance? : Graduation Day

Reissues
The album was also released as a limited-edition Gold CD by DCC Compact Classics, catalog number GZS-1089. It was mastered by Steve Hoffman and included 2 bonus tracks: "Darlin" and "I Can Hear Music". In addition, the live recording of "Graduation Day" was substituted with the studio version.

Track listing
All songs by Brian Wilson and Mike Love, except where noted.

Charts

Weekly charts

Year-end charts

References

External links

1975 greatest hits albums
The Beach Boys compilation albums
Capitol Records compilation albums